Mazuela is a municipality and town located in the province of Burgos, Castile and León, Spain. According to a 2008 estimate (INE), the municipality has a population of 97 inhabitants.  It is about 27 kilometers from Burgos, in the area southwest of the Burgos Province.

References 

Municipalities in the Province of Burgos